Capital South is a regional radio station owned and operated by Global as part of the Capital network. It broadcasts to Hampshire and Sussex from studios in Segensworth, Fareham.

The station launched on 6 April 2019, following the merger of Capital Brighton and Capital South Coast.

Overview

The regional station originally broadcast as two separate stations.
Ocean Sound began broadcasting to Hampshire in October 1986, after taking over the licence previously held by Radio Victory. The FM service for the West of the region was subsequently split off and relaunched as Power FM in December 1988, before becoming part of the Galaxy network in November 2008 and latterly, the Capital network in January 2011.
Surf 107 began broadcasting to Brighton and Hove in March 1998, subsequently relaunching as 'Juice 107.2' in 2001. The station was sold to Global from UKRD on 17 January 2018 for an undisclosed amount. The station closed down at midnight on 14 August 2018 and relaunched part of the Capital network in September 2018.

On 26 February 2019, Global confirmed the two Capital stations would be merged, following Ofcom's decision to relax local content obligations from commercial radio.

As of April 2019, regional output consists of a three-hour Drivetime show from Fareham on weekdays, alongside localised news bulletins, traffic updates and advertising for the two areas.

Programming
All networked programming originates from Global's London headquarters, including Capital Breakfast with Roman Kemp.

Regional programming is produced and broadcast from Global's Fareham studios from 4-7pm on weekdays, presented by Emma-Jo-Real-Davies and Dave Goodings.

News
Global's Fareham newsroom broadcasts localised news updates hourly from 6am-7pm on weekdays and 6am-12pm at weekends with headlines on the half-hour during Capital Breakfast on weekdays. Separate bulletins are produced for Hampshire and Sussex. The Fareham newsroom also produces bulletins for Heart South.

References

External links
 

South
Radio stations established in 2019
Radio stations in Hampshire
Radio stations in Sussex
2019 establishments in England